The Indian Ocean Games Triangulaire was a triangulaire, or tournament between three teams, between Mauritius, Réunion, and Madagascar. It was the predecessor to the Indian Ocean Island Games. The triangulaire was held every year from 1947 until 1958, and then once more in 1963. In 1963, the last game, Mauritius vs Madagascar was abandoned in the 54th minute, which gave Madagascar the win that year. After that, Mauritius did not want to play Madagascar, and the tournament was not held. In the football portion, Mauritius participated along with Réunion, Seychelles, Comoros, and the Maldives. Madagascar did not join until the second Indian Ocean Island Games, which was in Mauritius in 1985. The three triangulaire teams have been to every Indian Ocean Island Games since.

Past winners

Final Positions

See also
Mauritius at the Indian Ocean Games Triangulaire

References

 
Defunct international association football competitions in Africa
Football at the Indian Ocean Island Games
Recurring sporting events established in 1947
Recurring sporting events disestablished in 1963